

Education
Jayasekera was educated at St Peters College Bambalapitiya where he represented the college in First XV Rugby and moved to   S. Thomas' College, Mt Lavinia Sri Lanka, where he won colours in cricket, rugby and athletics.  He won the Gold medal in the under 19 110 metres Hurdles at the Public Schools Athletics meet in 1975 He played First XI cricket in a team captained by Sasi Ganeshan and played as a member of the  Sri Lanka Schools under 19 team
Other teammates included  Saliya Ahangama, Guy de Alwis, Arittha R Wikramanayake and Ishak Shahabdeen.
Sharm de Alwis refers to Jayasekera protesting at Trinity's slow scoring by bowling underarm.

School rugby
Jayasekera played for the Rugby first XV in 1975 (under PL Munasinghe) and 1976 (under Stefan D'Silva's captaincy). teammates in rugby included PL Munasinghe, Stefan D'Silva (Author), Rienzie Fernando,  Shane Pinder, Dr Peter Vanniasingham and Professor Devaka Fernando in the 1975 Rugby team coached by Quentin Israel later described as "the best Thomian team" by sports journalist Sharm de Alwis.

Club and national rugby
He went on to represent Havelock Sports Club and Sri Lanka in a partnership with fellow centre three quarter PL Munasinghe Jayasekera is regarded as one of the best threequarters to play rugby between 1968 and 1982.
He later served as a rugby administrator as Chairman of the board of selectors and Vice President of the Sri Lanka Rugby Football Union. He contested the post of President of the Sri Lanka Rugby Football Union

Professional
He was formerly Vice President - Head of Engineering & Projects Leisure Sector at John Keells Holdings. Currently he is the General Manager at Colombo City Centre Partners (pvt) Ltd, the owners and developers of the 48 storey Mega Mixed Development, Colombo City Centre.

References

Sri Lankan rugby union players
Living people
Year of birth missing (living people)
Alumni of S. Thomas' College, Mount Lavinia